James Stuart PC (2 January 1843 – 12 October 1913) was a British educator and politician. He was born in Markinch, Fife, and attended Madras College and the University of St Andrews before going to Trinity College, Cambridge. He later became a Fellow of the College and Professor of Mechanism and Applied Mechanics at Cambridge University from 1875; he was also Lord Rector of St Andrews from 1898 to 1901. Stuart was interested in popularising scientific topics and published several books on the subject.

Stuart was an unsuccessful Liberal candidate for the Cambridge University parliamentary seat in an 1882 by-election; in the 1884 by-election he was elected for Hackney. From the 1885 election he sat for the Hoxton division of Shoreditch. He became known for his contribution to London politics and in February 1890 was chosen as an Alderman of the London County Council; the added work caused him to resign his chair at Cambridge. The Progressive Party on the LCC chose him as its Leader shortly after his election but he stood down after the 1892 council election.

In the 1900 general election, Stuart lost his seat in Parliament. He returned briefly for Sunderland from 1906 until again being defeated in January 1910.  He was appointed to the Privy Council in 1909. Suffering poor health, he published his memoirs (Reminiscences) in 1912.

He married Laura, the eldest daughter of Jeremiah Colman (MP) and Caroline Colman. His sister in law Ethel Colman was the first female Lord Mayor of Norwich. He died in Carrow Abbey, Norwich on 12 October 1913. His wife and sisters in law's memorial to him was the 1915 erection of a block of 22 flats, to re-house some of those affected by the Norwich flood of 1912. Stuart Court is still used for low-income housing, managed by Norwich Housing Society.

Vanity Fair 

On 5 October 1899, his caricature appeared in Vanity Fair, accompanied by the following biographical note-
"Statesmen No.715
Dr James Stuart, M.P.
He became a Fifeshire Scotchman six-and-fifty years ago; and having been doubly educated (at St. Andrews University and at Trinity, Cambridge) he fashioned himself into a Professor of Mechanics and Applied Mechanics.  Then he tried to become Member for Cambridge University; but Cambridge University refusing the honour, he went to Hackney, which place he represented for precisely one year. Since then he has sat for the Hoxton Division of Shoreditch, while he lives in Grosvenor Road.
He neither shoots nor fishes, and he seldom takes a holiday; but he yachts, he cycles, he plays golf, and he sketches. He has also dabbled in journalism, being Chairman of the Board of The Star and Morning Leader Newspaper and Publishing Company, Limited. He is also the husband of the eldest daughter of Jeremiah James Colman: wherefore The Pall Mall Gazette once accused him of introducing mustard into The Star. He has done much to develop the pernicious system of University Extension; and his friends say that the most wonderful thing about him is how little he has been understood by the public.  He is many-sided and too enthusiastic. He champions Women's Suffrage because, being a student of Exact Science, he cannot understand Woman. He has, indeed, championed more than one unpopular movement; though he is said to have more intimate knowledge of London political and social questions than anyone else.  But he is a wicked Radical, whom the Water Companies hate, although he has friends among the Tories. He is a most tireless person of extraordinary physique, who can go all day without food; and though he can dine, he generally eats.
Although he is a Professor he is neither a prude nor a pedant; and if it were not for his pernicious Politics he would be a good fellow."

References

External links 
 
 

1843 births
1913 deaths
Liberal Party (UK) MPs for English constituencies
Members of London County Council
Members of the Privy Council of the United Kingdom
Alumni of the University of St Andrews
Rectors of the University of St Andrews
UK MPs 1880–1885
UK MPs 1885–1886
UK MPs 1886–1892
UK MPs 1892–1895
UK MPs 1895–1900
UK MPs 1906–1910
Hackney Members of Parliament
Progressive Party (London) politicians
Fellows of Trinity College, Cambridge
Alumni of Trinity College, Cambridge
People from Markinch
People educated at Madras College
Presidents of Co-operative Congress
Professors of engineering (Cambridge, 1875)